Golay may refer to:
 Jeanne Golay (born 1962), bicycle professional
 Helen Golay (born 1931), American woman who murdered two homeless men for life insurance money
 Marcel J. E. Golay (1902–1989), mathematician, physicist and information theorist
 Dolphy (1928-2012), Filipino actor and comedian, used Golay as his screen name in 1944.
Several devices and systems were named after Marcel J. E. Golay:
 Golay cell, a detector for infrared spectroscopy
 Savitzky–Golay filter, a signal processing filter
 Binary Golay code, an error-correcting code
 Ternary Golay code, an error-correcting code
Places:
 Golay, Kutch, a village in Kutch, Gujarat, India